Land mobile earth station (also: land mobile earth radio station) is – according to Article 1.74 of the International Telecommunication Union's (ITU) ITU Radio Regulations (RR) – defined as «A mobile earth station in the land mobile-satellite service capable of surface movement within the geographical limits of a country or continent.»
See also

Classification
In accordance with ITU Radio Regulations (article 1) this type of radio station might be classified as follows: 
Earth station (article 1.63)
Mobile earth station (article 1.68) of the mobile-satellite service (article 1.25)
Land earth station (article 1.70) of the fixed-satellite service (article 1.21) or mobile-satellite service
Land mobile earth station
Base earth station (article 1.72) of the fixed-satellite service
Coast earth station (article 1.76) of the fixed-satellite service / mobile-satellite service
Ship earth station (article 1.78) of the mobile-satellite service
Aeronautical earth station (article 1.82) of the fixed-satellite service / aeronautical mobile-satellite service (article 1.35)
Aircraft earth station (article 1.84) of the aeronautical mobile-satellite service

References / sources 

 International Telecommunication Union (ITU)

Radio stations and systems ITU